The Battle of Arroio Hondo, also known as Combat of Penimbu or Puru-Hué (Peru-Huê), took place on 3 August 1867, during the Paraguayan War.

The battle 

In the Penimbu region within Paraguay, a column of these, under the leadership of Commander Eustacio Rojas, had been attacked by a cavalry charge from the Brazilian National Guard under the command of brigadier Andrade Neves. After the attack, the Paraguayan troops fled being pursued to Posta Chuchu.

References 

Arroyo Hondo
Arroyo Hondo
Arroyo Hondo
August 1867 events